William Walter Inge (29 November 1907 – 18 March 1991) was an English cricketer.  Inge was a right-handed batsman who fielded as a wicket-keeper.  He was born at Holmwood, Surrey.

Inge made his debut in county cricket for Oxfordshire against Cambridgeshire in the 1928 Minor Counties Championship.  Three seasons later in 1930 while attending the University of Oxford, he made his first-class debut for Oxford University against Glamorgan at the University Parks, in what was his only first-class appearance for the university.  In that same season he was selected to play for a combined Minor Counties team, making two first-class appearances against Wales at Penrhyn Avenue, Rhos-on-Sea, and Lancashire at Old Trafford.  These two appearances bought him limited success, with 19 runs and behind the stumps a single catch and three stumpings.  He continued to play Minor counties cricket for Oxfordshire prior to World War II, making 68 appearances.  After the war he made a further 94 Minor Counties Championship appearances for Oxfordshire, playing his final match against Berkshire in 1955.

He died at Rugby, Warwickshire, on 18 March 1991.  Three relatives, Francis Inge, John Inge and William Inge, all played first-class cricket.  All three were great-uncles to Inge.

References

External links
Will Inge at ESPNcricinfo
Will Inge at CricketArchive

1907 births
1991 deaths
People from Mole Valley (district)
Alumni of the University of Oxford
English cricketers
Oxfordshire cricketers
Oxford University cricketers
Minor Counties cricketers
People from Holmwood
Wicket-keepers